Phostria caniusalis is a moth in the family Crambidae. It was described by Francis Walker in 1859. It is found in Sierra Leone.

References

Phostria
Moths described in 1859
Moths of Africa